Lionel James de Burgh Reed (31 December 1883 – 11 February 1957) was a British athlete.  He competed at the 1908 Summer Olympics in London. Born in Kensington, he was the 1910 winner of the 440-yard dash at the AAA Championships. In the 200 metres, Reed won his preliminary heat with a time of 23.2 seconds.  He dropped his time to 22.8 seconds in the semifinal, but that wasn't enough to beat Robert Cloughen's 22.6 seconds and Reed was eliminated without advancing to the final.

References

Sources
 
 
 

1883 births
1957 deaths
Athletes (track and field) at the 1908 Summer Olympics
Olympic athletes of Great Britain
Sportspeople from Kensington
British male sprinters
English male sprinters